Benjamin Rice Lacy (June 19, 1854 – February 21, 1929) served as North Carolina Commissioner of Labor from 1893–1897 and 1899–1901, and as North Carolina State Treasurer from 1901–1929. Lacy died one month after taking office for his eighth term as Treasurer.

Lacy's father, Rev. Drury Lacy II, was the president of Davidson College and his grandfather, Drury Lacy, was president of Hampden–Sydney College.

References
Department of State Treasurer: History
North Carolina Manual of 1913

North Carolina Commissioners of Labor
State treasurers of North Carolina
North Carolina Democrats
1854 births
1929 deaths